The Chasewater Railway is a former colliery railway  running round the shores of Chasewater in Staffordshire, England. It is now operated as a heritage railway.

History
Prior to preservation, the line was part of the network operated by the NCB to serve the coalfields of the Cannock Chase area.

Significant changes happened in 2002/2003 caused by the closure of the old Brownhills station, due to the building of the M6 Toll motorway.  This led to the rebuilding of Brownhills West with significantly improved facilities, including a new carriage shed and heritage centre, and completion of the Chasetown section of the line (the 'Chasetown Extension Railway' between Chasewater Heaths and Chasetown Church Street).

In 2016 the Railway was awarded The Queens Award for Voluntary Services.

Stations 
 Brownhills West
 Norton Lakeside Halt
 Chasewater Heaths (adjacent to Burntwood bypass)
 Chasetown Church Street

The buildings at Brownhills West house Chasewater Railway Museum.

Narrow gauge railway

Volunteers are working to establish a  gauge narrow gauge railway close to the heritage centre.

References

External links 

 
 Chasewater Railway Museum
 Chasewater Country Park

Heritage railways in Staffordshire
Lichfield District